The Sea Cadet (German: Der Seekadett) is a 1926 German silent drama film directed by Carl Boese and starring Walter Slezak, Gerd Briese and Fritz Alberti. It was shot at the Terra Studios in Berlin. The film's sets were designed by the art director Karl Görge.

Cast
 Walter Slezak 
 Gerd Briese 
 Fritz Alberti 
 Carl Auen 
 Colette Brettel 
 Christa Tordy 
 Eva Speyer 
 Teddy Bill 
 Sophie Pagay 
 Gottfried Hagedorn

References

Bibliography
 Alfred Krautz. International directory of cinematographers, set- and costume designers in film, Volume 4. Saur, 1984.

External links

1926 films
Films of the Weimar Republic
German silent feature films
Films directed by Carl Boese
German black-and-white films
Terra Film films
Films shot at Terra Studios
German drama films
1926 drama films